Bakchich was a French news website founded in May 2006.

It has some articles translated into English. Its name finds its origin in the Arabic word "baksheesh", which means money given to corrupt an official in order to cut down redtape (i.e. a bribe). The newspaper advocated a leftist allegiance.

It went into administration in 2011  and the site registration expired in 2016.

See also 
Rue 89, other news website founded in 2007 more centrist.

References

External links 
Who are we? Presentation of the website

French news websites
French-language websites
Internet properties established in 2006
2006 establishments in France